The Licensing (Ireland) Act 1902 (2 Edw. VII c. 18) was an Act of Parliament of the United Kingdom, given the royal assent on 31 July 1902, and repealed in 1923.

It prohibited the issue of new license for the sale of alcohol, for consumption on or off the premises, after the passage of the Act, except to:
 Premises currently licensed, or which had been licensed between 1 January 1902 and the date of the Act;
 Hotels (defined as a separate house with at least ten beds, used exclusively for the sleeping accommodation of travellers, and with no public bar); or
 Railway refreshment rooms.

However, local authorities were given wide powers to grant licenses outside these restrictions. If a lease on a licensed premises expired, causing the license to be surrendered, a new one could be granted to suitable premises in the immediate vicinity. There were also provisions for new licenses in parishes which had had significant increase in population. The granting of licenses to extensions of premises, or the transferral of licenses, was not affected by the act.

All premises had to be of a minimum rateable value, which varied from thirty pounds in Dublin and Belfast to ten in rural counties.

The Act extended to Ireland only, and was to continue in force until 31 December 1907. It was repealed in the United Kingdom, where it remained in force in Northern Ireland after partition by the Intoxicating Liquor Act (Northern Ireland) 1923.

References
The Public General Acts Passed in the Second Year of the Reign of His Majesty King Edward the Seventh. London: printed for His Majesty's Stationery Office. 1902.
Chronological table of the statutes; HMSO, London. 1993.

United Kingdom Acts of Parliament 1902
Alcohol law in the United Kingdom
Alcohol in Ireland
Acts of the Parliament of the United Kingdom concerning Ireland
1902 in Ireland